Hot Press is a monthly music and politics magazine based in Dublin, Ireland, founded in June 1977. The magazine has been edited since its inception by Niall Stokes.

History
Hot Press was founded in June 1977 by Niall Stokes, who continues to be its editor to the present day. Since then, the magazine has featured stories in the music world, both in Ireland and internationally.

The first issue of Hot Press featured Irish blues rock musician Rory Gallagher ahead of his headlining performance at Ireland's first open air rock festival, the Macroom Mountain Dew Festival, in 1977. The magazine has covered the career of U2 since the late 1970s. Sinéad O'Connor first talked to Hot Press about her lesbianism.

The magazine has been at the centre of several controversies: for example, Hot Press writer Stuart Clark was interviewing Oasis band member and songwriter Noel Gallagher when Gallagher found out that his brother Liam would not take the stage for that evening's performance, and the band came close to splitting up.

Hot Press was at the centre of a legal dispute over the copyright of the term De Dannan in 2009 after it featured an advertisement using the term to promote a new tour by the traditional group.

In September 2009, an interview conducted by Olaf Tyaransen with the comedian Tommy Tiernan at Electric Picnic 2009 proved controversial when Tiernan made some remarks which were later perceived as antisemitic. The comments were reported in the Irish and international media; however, both Tyaransen and Hot Press editor Niall Stokes, as well as Tiernan himself, defended them as being taken out of context.

In 2020, in reaction to the COVID-19 pandemic lock down in Ireland, Hot Press held a set of online music sessions called the Lockdown Sessions featuring artists such as Celaviedmai, Doppler, and Tebi Rex.

Contributors 
Past writers for Hot Press have included ninth President of Ireland Michael D. Higgins, the authors of BAFTA award-winning Father Ted, Graham Linehan and Arthur Mathews, Sunday Times television reviewer Liam Fay, author and Daily Telegraph columnist Neil McCormick, Bill Graham, The Sunday Business Post US correspondent Niall Stanage, Irish Examiner soccer correspondent Liam Mackey, author Damian Corless, the former The Irish Times columnist John Waters, food writer John McKenna, Sunday Independent journalist Declan Lynch and The Guardian football writer, Football Weekly regular Barry Glendenning, Daily Mail writer Jason O'Toole and Olaf Tyaransen.

Current writers include Peter Murphy, Jackie Hayden, and Pat Carty.

Politics
Hot Press has had a centrist stance on politics and social issues. During the 2007 general election it supported many smaller left wing parties such as the Green Party and Labour. It was critical of the then Fianna Fáil government, pro-Seanad reform and was opposed to the June 2007 decision of the Irish Film Censor's Office to ban the videogame Manhunt 2 This is the first time a video game has been refused certification by the IFCO.

The magazine has interviewed several politicians, including Sinn Féin's Gerry Adams, DUP's Ian Paisley Jr. MLA, leader of the Green Party, John Gormley and Minister for Finance, Brian Cowen.

The sort of smug know-all commentator... I suppose if anything annoys me, that annoys me... I could instance a load of fuckers whose throat I'd cut, and push over the nearest cliff, but there's no percentage in that. – Former Taoiseach Charles Haughey speaking to Hot Press writer John Waters in 1984.

In his May 2007 interview with Jason O'Toole, former Minister for Health Cowen admitted to smoking marijuana, saying,

Anyone who went to the UCD bar in the '70s that didn't get a whiff of marijuana would be telling you a lie. I would say there were a couple of occasions when it was passed around – and, unlike President Clinton, I did inhale! There wasn't a whole lot in it really – (it was like) a Sweet Afton, as a 10-year-old, under a railway bridge on a rainy day, in small town Ireland in the late '60s. I certainly got more enjoyment out of a few pints.

This confession later provoked much criticism from opposition parties in the Dáil. Ministers Willie O'Dea and Brian Lenihan Jnr played down the controversy, denying Cowen was "setting a bad example". Mr. Cowen later became Taoiseach following the resignation of Bertie Ahern.

In June 2007, DUP's Ian Paisley Jr. MLA caused uproar in an interview with Jason O'Toole by publicly denouncing acts associated with homosexuality. This was the year before Iris Robinson, wife of First Minister, Peter Robinson made her thoughts on the issue.

Hotpress.com
Hotpress.com is the magazine's website which as of this writing offers free articles to readers. It was launched in 2002, initially promising a free archive with 25 years of content.

Hot Press Yearbook
The Hot Press Yearbook is released annually.

Books
Hot Press has published several books:
A Man In A Woman's World by Jackie Hayden, general manager of Hot Press (co-published in Nov 2007 with Killynon House Books.)
Diary Of A Man, by Dermod Moore, 2005. A collection of essays by the magazine's columnist aka Bootboy.
The Rooms, by Declan Lynch, 2005. The third novel by Declan Lynch.
The Palace of Wisdom (Sex Lines & The Story of O), by Olaf Tyaransen (2004, 2002, 2000) (all of Olaf Tyaransen's books have covers featuring paintings by Irish Artist Graham Knuttel
McCann: War & Peace in Northern Ireland, by Eamonn McCann, 1998.
My Boy, by Philomena Lynott with Jackie Hayden, 1996 Synopsis: The story of Phil Lynott as told by his mother. It is also her story, from the days as a single mother bringing up a young black child in Manchester and Dublin, through the heady success of Thin Lizzy, to the tragic chain of events which ended her son's life and plunged her into depression.
Crime Ink, by Jason O'Toole, 2009 (a collection of O'Toole's Hot Press pieces published by Merlin Publishing). Top ten in the Irish Bestsellers Chart.
Why Can't We? – The Story Of The Cranberries And The Band's Iconic Frontwoman Dolores O'Riordan by Niall Stokes and Stuart Clark, 2021. Available in two formats, including a limited Deluxe Platinum Limited Edition autographed by the band members.

See also
 List of magazines in Ireland
 Music of Ireland
 Politics of the Republic of Ireland

References

External links
 Official site

1977 establishments in Ireland
1970s in Irish music
1980s in Irish music
1990s in Irish music
2000s in Irish music
2010s in Irish music
Biweekly magazines
Music magazines published in Ireland
Political magazines published in Ireland
Magazines established in 1977
Magazines published in the Republic of Ireland
Music in Dublin (city)
Mass media in Dublin (city)
1977 in Irish music